In the Houston Astros' 1984 American baseball season, the Houston Astros competed in the National League West.

Offseason 
 February 17, 1984: J. R. Richard was signed as a free agent by the Astros.

Regular season

Season standings

Record vs. opponents

Notable transactions 
 April 27, 1984: J. R. Richard was released by the Astros.
 May 25, 1984: Alan Bannister was traded by the Astros to the Texas Rangers for Mike Richardt.
 June 4, 1984: 1984 Major League Baseball Draft
Ken Caminiti was drafted by the Astros in the 3rd round. Player signed June 9, 1984.
John Vander Wal was drafted by the Astros in the 8th round, but did not sign.
 July 4, 1984: Scott Loucks was traded by the Astros to the Montreal Expos for Brad Mills.
 August 28, 1984: Ray Knight was traded by the Astros to the New York Mets for players to be named later. The New York Mets completed the trade by sending Gerald Young and Manuel Lee to the Astros on August 31 and Mitch Cook (minors) to the Astros on September 10.

Roster

Player stats

Batting

Starters by position 
Note: Pos = Position; G = Games played; AB = At bats; H = Hits; Avg. = Batting average; HR = Home runs; RBI = Runs batted in

Other batters 
Note: G = Games played; AB = At bats; H = Hits; Avg. = Batting average; HR = Home runs; RBI = Runs batted in

Pitching

Starting pitchers 
Note: G = Games pitched; IP = Innings pitched; W = Wins; L = Losses; ERA = Earned run average; SO = Strikeouts

Other pitchers 
Note: G = Games pitched; IP = Innings pitched; W = Wins; L = Losses; ERA = Earned run average; SO = Strikeouts

Relief pitchers 
Note: G = Games pitched; W = Wins; L = Losses; SV = Saves; ERA = Earned run average; SO = Strikeouts

Farm system 

LEAGUE CHAMPIONS: Asheville

References

External links
1984 Houston Astros season at Baseball Reference

Houston Astros seasons
1984 Major League Baseball season
1984 in sports in Texas